Alexander Dreyschock (15 October 1818 – 1 April 1869) was a Czech pianist and composer.

Born in Žáky in Bohemia, his musical talents were first noticed at age of eight, and at age fifteen he travelled to Prague to study piano and composition with Václav Tomášek. By the age of twenty, Dreyschock undertook his first professional tour in December 1838, performing in various northern and central towns in Germany.

Subsequent tours saw him visiting Russia (1840–42), Paris (spring 1843), London, the Netherlands, Austria and Hungary (1846), as well as Denmark and Sweden in 1849. Elsewhere he caused a sensation with prodigious execution of thirds, sixths, and octaves, plus other tricks. When he made his Paris debut in 1843 he included a piece for the left hand alone. Dreyschock's left hand was renowned, and his most famous technical stunt was to play the left-hand arpeggios of Chopin's Revolutionary Étude in octaves. Observers of the time reported that he played it in correct tempo, and it is known that he programmed it in all of his recitals.

In 1862, Dreyschock became a staff member at the newly founded St. Petersburg Conservatory at Anton Rubinstein's invitation. His students included Arkady Abaza. He was appointed Court Pianist to the Tsar as well as Director of the Imperial School of Music for the Operatic Stage. Whilst he maintained this double post for six years, his health suffered from the Russian climate. He moved to Italy in 1868, but the change of residence did him little good, and he died of tuberculosis, aged fifty, in Venice. At the wish of his family he was buried at the Olšany Cemetery in Prague.

Compositions

References

External links
 

1818 births
1869 deaths
People from Kutná Hora District
People from the Kingdom of Bohemia
19th-century classical composers
19th-century classical pianists
19th-century Czech people
19th-century Czech male musicians
Czech classical pianists
Czech expatriates in Italy
Czech expatriates in Russia
Czech male classical composers
Czech Romantic composers
Male classical pianists
Pupils of Václav Tomášek
Burials at Olšany Cemetery